Salvador Puig Antich (30 May 1948 – 2 March 1974) was a Spanish militant anarchist from Catalonia. His execution for involvement in a bank robbery and shooting a police officer dead became a cause célèbre in Francoist Spain for Catalan autonomists, pro-independence supporters, and anarchists. After fighting the Spanish state with the terrorist group Iberian Liberation Movement in the early 1970s, he was convicted and executed by garrote for the death of a police officer during a shoot-out.

Catalonians viewed Puig Antich's judicial death as symbolic retribution for the region's fight for self-government, and his name became commonplace in Barcelona. The incident inspired works by Catalan artists Joan Miró and Antoni Tàpies, and a satirical play by the Catalan theater group . The 2006 film Salvador depicts Puig Antich's time on death row. After the Spanish Supreme Court declined an effort to review the execution, an Argentine court adopted the case under universal jurisdiction in 2013.

Iberian Liberation Movement 

Salvador Puig Antich was born 30 May 1948, in Barcelona, Spain. He was a member of the Workers' Commissions before he joined the Iberian Liberation Movement (Movimiento Ibérico de Liberación, or MIL). The group organized armed robberies against banks, which they called "expropriations", allegedly to fund their actions against Francoist Spain in 1972 and 1973. After a series of these robberies, he was arrested for the death of a policeman during a shootout. A military court sentenced him to death by garrote vil in the Model prison. His execution proceeded despite international outcry, as Spain's second state execution in eight years. University students in Barcelona and Madrid went on strike in protest of the execution, whereupon they fought with police.

The execution of Georg Michael Welzel (Heinz Ches) 
The same day, Georg Michael Welzel, from Cottbus (then GDR), was executed in Tarragona, charged for killing a policeman. He was known as Heinz Ches because he declared it was his name and to be Polish, from Szczecin. The execution of Georg Michael Welzel, a common criminal, was seen as an intent of Francoist regime to downplay the importance of the execution of a political activist like Puig Antich.

Legacy 

Catalonians interpreted Puig Antich's execution as symbolic retaliation for the region's fight for autonomy, which led to public demonstrations. As one of the last convicted revolutionaries executed by Franco, Puig Antich became a household name in Barcelona. The Groupes d'action révolutionnaire internationalistes (GARI) formed to avenge his death.

Several years after his 1974 execution, the Catalan performance group Els Joglars performed La torna, a 1977 satire against torture based on the execution of Puig Antich and Heinz Ches. Even though Francoist Spain had ended, along with its censorship laws, members of Els Joglars were jailed or forced into exile. Spanish theater groups protested across Spain. Catalan painters Joan Miró and Antoni Tàpies both alluded to Puig Antich's execution in their mid-1970s work. Miró's The Hope of a Condemned Man triptych features a line that "sighs and falls with faltering resignation" and flicked paint. Tàpies's Assassins lithograph series, presented at the Parisian Galerie Maeght, too was inspired by Puig Antich's execution and Spanish politics. The 2006 film Salvador depicts Puig Antich's time spent on death row.

An effort by family members and outside groups to review Puig Antich's case was rejected by the Spanish Supreme Court in 2007, but an Argentinian judge adopted the case along with several others under universal jurisdiction in 2013.

Puig Antich is interred in the Montjuïc Cemetery in Barcelona.

References

Further reading

External links 
Articles about Salvador Puig Antich from the Kate Sharpley Library
Papers at the Pavelló de la República CRAI Library

1948 births
1974 deaths
Anarchists from Catalonia
Executed anarchists
Executed Spanish people
Insurrectionary anarchists
People executed by Francoist Spain
People executed by ligature strangulation
People executed for murdering police officers
Politicians from Barcelona
Spanish anarchists
Spanish people convicted of murdering police officers
Spanish revolutionaries
Catalan prisoners and detainees
Burials at Montjuïc Cemetery